Earth Rot is an album by David Axelrod that released in 1970. The album was recorded with a choir singing from the Book of Isaiah and "Song of the Earth Spirit", a Navajo myth, and an orchestra that included Earl Palmer, and Ernie Watts.

Track listing
All music composed by David Axelrod; "lyrics adapted by Michael T. Axelrod from The Book of Isaiah, The Old Testament and adapted from Song of the Earth Spirit, a Navajo origin legend."
Side 1
 "The Warnings Part 1"  – 2:52
 "The Warnings Part 2"  – 4:27
 "The Warnings Part 3"  – 5:06
 "The Warnings Part 4"  – 3:11

Side 2
 "The Signs Part 1"  – 3:43
 "The Signs Part 2"  – 3:43
 "The Signs Part 3"  – 2:36
 "The Signs Part 4"  - 3:12

Personnel
 Allen De Rienzo – trumpet
 Frederick Hill – trumpet
 Dick Hyde – trombone
 Richard Leith – trombone
 William E. Green – tenor saxophone, baritone saxophone, flute
 Jackie Kelso – tenor saxophone, baritone saxophone, flute
 Ernie Watts – tenor saxophone, flute
 Don Randi – piano
 Sonny Anderson – vibraphone
 Gary Coleman – vibraphone
 Dennis Budimir – guitar
 Louis Morell – guitar
 Robert West – bass
 Arthur Wright – bass
 Earl Palmer – drums
 Clark Eran Gassman, Diana Lee, Gerri Engemann, Jacqueline Mae Ellen, Janice Gassman, Jerry Whitman, Jon Joyce, Lewis E. Moreford, Tom Bahler - choir

References 

1970 albums
David Axelrod (musician) albums
Instrumental albums
Capitol Records albums
Albums produced by David Axelrod (musician)